"Hot Blooded" is a song by the British-American rock band Foreigner, from their second studio album Double Vision. It was released as a single in June 1978 and reached #3 on the Billboard Hot 100 chart that September.  The single was also certified Platinum (one million units sold) by the Recording Industry Association of America. It is also the theme song to the truTV scripted series Tacoma FD.

Background
Foreigner lead singer Lou Gramm has stated:

We used to work at Mick's apartment and he would just keep playing one guitar riff after another. Just playing whatever came into his mind. When he started playing that riff, I remember saying, “Wait! Stop! What’s that?” Mick said it was just another riff. So, I started singing along to it. We eventually got the idea of what the chorus would be and then started working on the verse lyrics. Once they were put together it naturally led to the “Hot Blooded” verbal line. I remember we were jumping off the walls when we cracked the title of the song.

Lyrics and music
Los Angeles Times critic Robert Hilburn  explained the lyrics of "Hot Blooded" as being "a macho-ish reflection of a rock star's seductive intent."  According to lead singer and co-author Lou Gramm the song is "a bit tongue-in-cheek, but really, it is a problem meeting ladies on the road.  You see somebody in the audience you want to meet, but after the show, by the time you're through doing interviews and getting cleaned up, there's nobody around.  You find yourself wandering around a city alone with nothing to do."

The Record critic Rick Atkinson described "Hot Blooded" as using a common rock and roll opening and chord progression but that "a carefully placed guitar line here and a fast burst of keyboards there leaves the whole melange with a new feel."  St. Joseph News-Press critic Conrad Bibens described "Hot Blooded" as a "Free soundalike that lets [lead singer Lou] Gramm sing in the gruff manner of Paul Rodgers."  Stereo Review critic Joel Vance stated that it "begins with a familiar chug-chug guitar figure like the one used in 1969 on "Gimme Gimme Good Lovin'," a bubblegum hit with rhythm-and-blues overtones, and both songs are about a fellow in search of fleshy fluff."

Reception
Billboard described "Hot Blooded" as "a high energy rocker that boils with a feverent energy." It compared the "powerhouse" guitar playing and the vocals with Bad Company, but said the song retains Foreigner's own identifiable sound.  
Cash Box called it "driving, unadorned rock 'n' roll," saying that "the vocal arrangement is crisp and insistent" and the "guitars provide sinister, hard-edged power." Record World said that it "should continue [the] AOR and pop impact" Foreigner had with their debut album. Music critic Maury Dean stated that "Lou Gramm's craggy tenor spins around the note, rocking dynamite rhythms in note-bending ecstasy."

Hilburn described '"Hot Blooded" as touching on "the snarl of Bad Company, the wryness of Rod Stewart and the sensualness of the Rolling Stones" but complained the song lacked authenticity.  According to Atkinson, the musicianship and arrangement make "Hot Blooded" superior to any previous song using this chord combination.  San Pedro News-Pilot critic Joseph Bensoua said it has "just the right hooks, phrasing and simple lyrics needed for controlled rock 'n' roll."

In a negative review of Double Vision, Robert Christgau wrote, "I like rock and roll so much that I catch myself getting off on 'Hot Blooded,' a typical piece of cock-rock nookie-hating carried along on a riff-with-chord-change that's pure (gad) second-generation Bad Company."  Billboard reviewer Gary Graff rated "Hot Blooded" Foreigner's 4th greatest song.  Classic Rock History critic Brian Kachejian rated it as Foreigner's 3rd best song, particularly praising the "smoking bass line and grooving drums" and "Mick Jones’ guitar licks."

"That's a great fuckin' driving song…" enthused Slipknot front-man Corey Taylor. "I got that on Complete Greatest Hits, because I'm not gonna surf through all the filler to get to the songs I like."

Personnel
 Lou Gramm – lead vocals, percussion
 Mick Jones – guitar, backing vocals, piano
 Ian McDonald – guitar, reeds, keyboards, backing vocals
 Al Greenwood – keyboards, synthesizers
 Ed Gagliardi – bass guitar, backing vocals
 Dennis Elliott – drums, backing vocals

Chart history

Weekly charts

Year-end charts

External links
Audio of the song (album version) on GrooveShark
Audio of the song (single version) on YouTube

References

1978 singles
Foreigner (band) songs
Songs written by Mick Jones (Foreigner)
Songs written by Lou Gramm
Song recordings produced by Keith Olsen
1978 songs
Atlantic Records singles
Song recordings produced by Mick Jones (Foreigner)
Song recordings produced by Ian McDonald (musician)